Andrei Alekseyevich Sinitsyn (born 23 June 1988) is a Russian professional football player. He plays as a goalkeeper.

Career
On 20 June 2014, Sinitsyn signed a two-year contract extension with FC Krasnodar, taking him up to the summer of 2017.

On 25 August 2021, he joined FC Nizhny Novgorod.

Career statistics

Honours
 Russian Second Division, Zone East best goalkeeper: 2010.

References

External links

 

1988 births
People from Krasnokamensky District
Living people
Russian footballers
Association football goalkeepers
FC Chita players
FC Yenisey Krasnoyarsk players
FC Krasnodar players
FC Akron Tolyatti players
FC Nizhny Novgorod (2015) players
FC Dynamo Makhachkala players
Russian Premier League players
Russian First League players
Russian Second League players
Sportspeople from Zabaykalsky Krai